The Mount St. Mary's Mountaineers women's soccer team represents Mount St. Mary's University in the Metro Atlantic Athletic Conference of NCAA Division I college soccer.

Players

2021 Women's Soccer Roster

1	Drew Camp	GK	Fr.	5-8	Kintnersville, Pa. / Palisades

3	Cheyenna Cook	D	Sr.	5-5	Bridgewater, N.J. / Bridgewater-Raritan

7	Kalli Bell	M	Jr.	5-5	Baltimore, Md. / Sparrows Point

8	Alexa Dragisics	F	So.	5-3	Ellicott City, Md. / Mount Hebron

10	Madison Bee	F	Jr.	5-10	Haddonfield, N.J. / Haddonfield

11	Daniella DiBiase	F	So.	5-3	East Hanover, N.J. / DePaul Catholic

12	Arden Lembryk	GK	So.	5-5	Wayne, N.J. / Wayne Valley

13	Kayley Kocent	M	So.	5-3	Baltimore, Md. / Sparrows Point

15	Brenda Aleman	D	Jr.	5-5	Derwood, Md. / St.John's College

16	Isabella Wendler	F	So.	5-6	Manheim, Pa. / Manheim Central

19	Mikayla Bates	M	Jr.	5-4	Easton, Pa. / Notre Dame

20	Emily Streett	D	Fr.	5-5	Sykesville, Md. / Century

21	Lindsay Reightler	F	Jr.	5-5	Schnecksville, Pa. / Parkland

22	Hannah Cooksey	F	Jr.	5-3	Pennsville, N.J. / Pennsville

23	Madi Stanchina	D	Jr.	5-7	Easton, Pa. / Easton

24	Kayla Pennington	D	So.	5-5	Reading, Pa. / Wilson

25	Isabella Roberts	F	Sr.	5-1	Anchorage, Alaska / West

26	Liliana Vargas	D	So.	5-3	Lexington, Va. / Rockbridge County

28	Alex Piccinich	D	Jr.	5-4	Freehold, N.J. / Howell

32	Kelsey White	F	Fr.	5-7	Northfield, N.J. / Ocean City

Personnel

Current technical staff

Coaching history

Awards

First Team All-Conference
  Anna Lebo (2007)
  Anna Lebo (2006)
  Keli Stevens (2003)
  Keli Stevens (2002)
 Nicki Trumpler (1998)
 Amanda Gilbert (1997)

Second Team All-Conference
  Karyn Farrar (2008)
  Margaret Pyzik (2004)
  Robin Coveleski (1999)
  Robin Coveleski (1998)
 Amanda Gilbert (1998)

References

External links
 

NCAA Division I women's soccer teams
Women's
Metro Atlantic Athletic Conference women's soccer